Michelle Louise Tumes (born 1971) is an Australian contemporary Christian musician from Adelaide. In 1993, she moved to the United States and has released five studio albums, Listen (1998), Center of My Universe (2000), Dream (2001), Michelle Tumes (2006) and Christmas Is Here (2007).

Career
Michelle Louise Tumes was born in 1971 and grew up in Adelaide. She has a younger sister and younger brother. Tumes learned piano from the age of four years, and as a teenager was enrolled into a classical piano course. She first signed with an Australian publisher, but by 1993 had moved to Nashville, Tennessee. She wrote songs for Christian contemporary musicians such as Jaci Velasquez and Jump5. In 1997 she signed with Sparrow Records, her debut album, Listen, was released in 1998.

Her music has become popular worldwide, frequently being played on radio stations for the genre. Her style is a blend of soft acoustic pop with an ethereal element. She appeared on the Thomas Kinkade 2001 album, Music of Light, with Rob Mathes and Bill Miller. It included her 1998 hit, "Healing Waters", which was co-written by Tumes with Matt Husemann of Franklin, Tennessee. She also composed and performed songs in the movie No Greater Love.

In 2015, she began working as the music director at Calvary Community Church in Westlake Village, California.

Personal life
Michelle Tumes married Douglas Higgins on 26 December 1999.

Discography

Albums
Studio albums
Listen (1998; Sparrow Records)
Center of My Universe (2000; Sparrow Records)
Dream (2001; Sparrow Records)
Michelle Tumes (2006; Levantar Records)

Compilations and EPs
 Very Best of Michelle Tumes (2006; Sparrow Records)
Christmas Is Here (2007; Levantar Records) 
Greatest Hits (2008; EMI CMG Label Group)

Other appearances
 Hear and Beyond, Various Artists ("Listen") 1996
 Experiencing God, Various Artists ("All Your Works Are Wonderful") 1998
 Listen to Our Hearts Vol. 1, Various Artists ("What a Wondrous Love Is This" and "Heaven Will Be Near Me") 1998
 Get Real Music Sampler, Various Artists ("Heaven Will Be Near Me") 1998
 Heaven and Earth: A Tapestry of Worship, Various Artists ("For the Glory of Your Name" and "My Dwelling Place") 1999
 To Have & To Hold: 15 Songs of Love & Marriage, Various Artists ("My Constant Love") 1999
 Streams, Various Artists ("Hold On") 1999
 Thomas Kinkade: Music of Light (features Rob Mathes and Tumes) 2000
 Keep The Faith 2000, Various Artists ("He's Watching Over You") 2000
 The Mercy Project, Various Artists ("Sanctuary") 2000
 Hear It First New Music Sampler, Various Artists ("Dream") 2001
 Your Love Broke Through: The Worship Songs of Keith Green, Various Artists ("There Is a Redeemer") 2002
 Lost in Wonder: Voices of Worship (features Tumes, Susan Ashton and Christine Dente) 2005
 The Wonderful Cross, Various Artists ("In Christ Alone" and "Beautiful Savior (All My Days)") 2007
 90's Ultimate Collection, Various Artists ("For the Glory of Your Name") 2007
 The Worship Lounge, Various Artists ("Your Love Falls Down") 2008
 Worship for the Evening, Various Artists (For the Glory of Your Name" and "Love Falls Down") 2008
 Be Still & Know: Peaceful Voices for Quite Moments Various Artists ("Christ of Hope") 2009
 Meditate & Worship, Various Artists ("He's Watching Over You") 2009
 No Greater Love (Soundtrack) 2009

References

External links

[ Michelle Tumes] at Allmusic

1971 births
Living people
Australian performers of Christian music
Musicians from Adelaide
21st-century Australian singers
21st-century Australian women singers